Marvel Realm of Champions was a mobile fighting game developed by Kabam as a spinoff for their other Marvel game Contest of Champions. The free-to-play game with in-game Store purchases launched globally on December 16, 2020. On January 13, 2022, it was announced that the game would shut down on March 31 of that year.

Setting
Realm of Champions was set in the continuity of Kabam's previous Marvel game Contest of Champions and ran concurrently to it. While Contest was based on the Contest of Champions story arc and depicted multiple Marvel Comics characters from various alternate realities being abducted to participate in the titular Contest in the "Battlerealm", Realm drew inspiration from Secret Wars storyline and was set on the Battleworld, a patchwork planet made from various alternate Earths. Remnants of each reality formed a "House" which was ruled by a "Baron", all of whom were alternate takes on existing Marvel character (such as Gwen Stacy who took on the role of Madame Web or Shuri who became Queen of Wakanda). Players controlled original characters who were members of each House's special fighting force, such as "Sorcerers Supreme" or "Web-Warriors". There was cross-promotion between the two games, as several characters who originated in Realm were added to Contest as playable characters.

Plot
When Battleworld was formed, Maestro united each of the realms. One day, Maestro was found mysteriously murdered. Because of this, armed conflicts erupted around the realms causing widespread war that was imminent. In a last-ditch effort, the leaders of each "Houses" gathered in a secret location. These leaders consisted of Stark Prime: CEO of the House of Iron, Madame Web: Master Weaver of the Spider Guild, Skaar: Warlord of the Gamma Horde, President Peggy Carter of the Patriot Garrison, Stephen Strange the Ancient One of the Temple of Vishanti, War Thor: Warrior Queen of the Asgardian Republic, Logan: Shogun of the Clan of Wolverine, Queen Shuri of Wakanda, and Deadpool Supreme of Los Mercs 4 Gold. They gain late arrivals in the form of Apocalypse: Pharaoh of Pyramid X, Viv Vision of the House of Iron, and King Groot of the Land of Groot. When the Barons start arguing, Stark Prime is revealed to be an Iron Man armor operated by Tony Stark's A.I. hologram called F.R.I.E.N.D. (short for Finite Recording Intelligence Embodiment Nanotech Defense) as he states that Maestro has kept their rivalries in check as he proposes that they can shape the upcoming conflict into something that they can control.

The tie-in web series Marvel Realm of Champions: Elegy which concluded the game had the news reporter Anathi of Wakanda investigating the death of Maestro. When she combs Maestro's palace for clues, she is confronted by Stark Prime, Madame Web, Skaar, President Carter, Stephen Strange, War Thor, Queen Shuri, and Apocalypse. Upon noting that different items from different Houses were found at the crime scene, Anathi states that this was a Caesar situation. Stephen Strange revealed that 8,000 Barons actually did it. Taken into the past by Stephen Strange using a spell, Anathi is shown that the Barons were originally supposed to combine their powers and apprehend Maestro. Unfortunately, Maestro was too strong for them. Stephen Strange did a costly last resort by arranging for a Multiversal attack by calling the Barons from other versions of Battleworld to help out. They managed to weaken Maestro, but a cosmic will tested them to see if they can be as ruthless as Maestro. They all passed. Strange Supreme and Anathi are then attacked by a celestial parasite called the Chronoserpent. Upon being dragged into Battleworld, the Chronoserpent is confronted by a version of Doctor Strange who summons Galactus causing President Carter to initiate a planetary evacuation. They reach an Iron Man-type spaceship as they evacuate to the Contest of Champions. Anathi reports on the Chronoserpent to her remaining listeners stating how they use worlds as hosts and use hosts to grow stronger like what a Chronoserpent did to Maestro. As Galactus fights the Chronoserpent, everyone evacuates Battleworld as Anathi states that it won't survive the conflict. Anathi concludes her report stating that she will miss the world that contained wizards, mutants, robots, and spider people. She also mentions that Battleworld had the best coffee and that the sunset was patchwork of different skies of many colors. Anathi hopes that her subscribers got off of Battleworld or else they would get crushed by Galactus as she concludes her broadcast.

Gameplay
Players took control of a fighter for one of the Houses, who were named in honor of a legacy character (such as Hulk, Storm or Black Panther). Each character utilized different skills and was intended to represent different playstyles. There was no storyline mode or other solo missions to advance, as all game modes were a variety of multiplayer: Arena Conquest in which two groups of 3 players each fought over control of an area, Stronghold in which 3 players protected a core from a group of enemies, Deathmatch with 3 teams of 2 players fighting one another over points and Onslaught, a survival mode against waves of enemies of progressing difficulty. After each match players would receive a selection of equipment (only usable for specific characters) and currency which could be applied to improving desired equipment on a selected character.

Reception
The game received mixed reviews at launch. Zach Guida of Hardcore Droid complimented the quick matchmaking and the short duration of the matches, giving the game 4 stars out of 5. Nick Petrasiti of The Sixth Axis found the matches fun and the gameplay easy enough to get into, while also noticing the small character selection, lack of tactics and issues with gear customization, where selecting higher stats inevitably led the characters to wear mismatched parts of different outfits.  Eric Halliday of App Trigger Gaming also criticized extremely limited character selection, lack of storyline and mismatched outfits on the characters, concluding that game was not worth one's time.

In a mid-2021 review that followed several game updates, Alex Sinclair Lack of MobileGames.com complimented the addition of Thor as a new character and cinematics which added actual story content, but also noticed that the lack of new game modes made the short matches feel very repetitive, while visuals of the hero abilities were disappointing, and the graphics were below industry average. He gave the game an overall 6/10 score, concluding that the game lacked anything exceptional.

References

2020 video games
Android (operating system) games
Free online games
Fighting games
IOS games
Superhero crossover video games
Video games based on Marvel Comics
Video games developed in the United States
Video games about parallel universes
Kabam games